Rengali (Sl. No.: 16) is a Vidhan Sabha constituency of Sambalpur district, Odisha.
This constituency includes Rengali block, Dhankauda block and 10GPs (Gunderpur, Batemura, Bhikampur, Maneswar, Mathpali, Nuatihura, Parmanpur, Sindurpank, Tabala and Themra) of Maneswar block.

Elected Members

3 elections held during 2009 to 2019. List of members elected from Rengali constituency are:
 2019:(16):  Nauri Nayak (BJP)
2014: (16): Ramesh Patua (BJD)
 2009: (16): Duryodhan Gardia (Congress)

2019 Election Result
In 2019 election Bharatiya Janata Party candidate Nauri Nayak, defeated Biju Janata Dal candidate Reena Tanty  by a margin of 6,743 votes.

2014 Election Result
In 2014 election Biju Janata Dal candidate Ramesh Patua, defeated Bharatiya Janata Party candidate Nauri Nayak by a margin of 1,830 votes.

2009 Election Result
In 2009 election Indian National Congress candidate Duryodhan Gardia, defeated Independent candidate M. B. Pyariraj by a margin of 13,784 votes.

Notes

References

Sambalpur district
Assembly constituencies of Odisha